The ghazal (Hindi-Urdu: /) is a form of amatory poem or ode, originating in Arabic poetry. Ghazals often deal with topics of spiritual and romantic love and may be understood as a poetic expression of both the pain of loss or separation from the beloved and the beauty of love in spite of that pain.

The ghazal form is ancient, tracing its origins to 7th-century Arabic poetry. The ghazal spread into South Asia in the 12th century due to the influence of Sufi mystics and the courts of the new Islamic Sultanate, and is now most prominently a form of poetry of many languages of the Indian subcontinent and Turkey.

A ghazal commonly consists of five to fifteen couplets, which are independent, but are linked – abstractly, in their theme; and more strictly in their poetic form. The structural requirements of the ghazal are similar in stringency to those of the Petrarchan sonnet. In style and content, due to its highly allusive nature, the ghazal has proved capable of an extraordinary variety of expression around its central themes of love and separation.

Postmodern Ghazal refers to a literary movement that began in the 1990s in Iran, claiming to mix postmodern ideas and traditional Persian poetry arrangements.

Etymology and pronunciation 

The word ghazal originates from the Arabic word  (ġazal). The root syllables Gh-Z-L have three possible meanings in Arabic:

  (ḡazaal) - A young, graceful doe (this is the root of the English word gazelle).
  (ḡazala) - to spin (thread or yarn).

The poetic form derives its name from the first and the second etymological roots, One particular translation posits a meaning of ghazal as the wail of a wounded deer, which potentially provides context to the theme of unrequited love common to many ghazals.

The Arabic word  ġazal is pronounced , roughly like the English word guzzle, but with the ġ pronounced without a complete closure between the tongue and the soft palate.

Poetic form 
The ghazal is a short poem consisting of rhyming couplets, called bayt or sher. Most ghazals have between seven and twelve bayts. For a poem to be considered a true ghazal, it must have no fewer than five couplets. Almost all ghazals confine themselves to less than fifteen couplets (poems that exceed this length are more accurately considered as qasidas). Ghazal couplets end with the same rhyming pattern and are expected to have the same meter. The ghazal's uniqueness arises from its rhyme and refrain rules, referred to as the qaafiyaa and radif respectively. A ghazal's rhyming pattern may be described as AA BA CA DA, and so on.

In its strictest form, a ghazal must follow a number of rules:

 Matla'a: The first sher in a ghazal is called the matlaa. Both lines of the matla must contain the qaafiyaa and radif. The matlaa sets the tone of the ghazal, as well as its rhyming and refrain pattern. .
 Radif: The refrain word or phrase. Both lines of the matlaa and the second lines of all subsequent shers must end in the same refrain word called the radif. 
 Qaafiyaa: The rhyming pattern. The radif is immediately preceded by words or phrases with the same end rhyme pattern, called the qaafiyaa. 
 Maqta'a/Maktaa: The last couplet of the ghazal is called the maqtaa. It is common in ghazals for the poet's nom de plume, known as takhallus to be featured in the maqtaa. The maqtaa is typically more personal than the other couplets in a ghazal. The creativity with which a poet incorporates homonymous meanings of their takhallus to offer additional layers of meaning to the couplet is an indicator of their skill.
 Bahr/Behr: Each line of a ghazal must follow the same metrical pattern and syllabic (or morae) count.
 Misra-e-uulaa: The first line of each verse must be a statement.
 Misra-e-sani: The second line of each verse must be the proof of statement given in the first line.

Unlike in a nazm, a ghazal's couplets do not need a common theme or continuity. Each sher is self-contained and independent from the others, containing the complete expression of an idea. However, the shers all contain a thematic or tonal connection to each other, which may be highly allusive. A common conceit that traces its history to the origins of the ghazal form is that the poem is addressed to a beloved by the narrator.

Interpreting a ghazal 
The Ghazal tradition is marked by the poetry's ambiguity and simultaneity of meaning. Learning the common tropes is key to understanding the ghazal.

There are several locations a sher might take place in the Urdu/South Asian tradition:

 The Garden, where the poet often takes on the personage of the bulbul, a songbird. The poet is singing to the beloved, who is often embodied as a rose.

hoon garmi-i-nishat-i-tasavvur se naghma sanj

Main andalib-i-gulshan-i-na afridah hoon

- Ghalib

I sing from the warmth of the passionate joy of thought

I am the bulbul of a garden not yet created

 The Tavern, or the maikhana, where the poet drinks wine in search of enlightenment, union with God, and desolation of self.

mir un neem-baaz ankhon men saari masti sharab ki si hai

- Mir Taqi Mir

 'Mir' is in those half-closed eyes all flirtation is a bit like wine

History

Origins in Arabia 
The ghazal originated in Arabia in the 7th century, evolving from the qasida, a much older pre-Islamic Arabic poetic form. Qaṣīdas were typically much longer poems, with up to 100 couplets. Thematically, qaṣīdas did not include love, and were usually panegyrics for a tribe or ruler, lampoons, or moral maxims. However, the qaṣīda's opening prelude, called the nasīb, was typically nostalgic and/or romantic in theme, and highly ornamented and stylized in form. In time, the nasīb began to be written as standalone, shorter poems, which became the ghazal.

The ghazal came into its own as a poetic genre during the Umayyad era (661–750) and continued to flower and develop in the early Abbasid era. The Arabic ghazal inherited the formal verse structure of the qaṣīda, specifically, a strict adherence to meter and the use of the Qaafiyaa, a common end rhyme on each couplet (called a bayt in Arabic and a sher in Persian).

The nature of the ghazals also changed to meet the demands of musical presentation, becoming briefer in length. Lighter poetic meters, such as khafîf, ramal, and muqtarab were preferred, instead of longer, more ponderous meters favored for qaṣīdas (such as kâmil, basît, and rajaz). Topically, the ghazal focus also changed, from nostalgic reminiscences of the homeland and loved ones, towards romantic or erotic themes. These included sub-genres with themes of courtly love (udharî), eroticism (hissî), homoeroticism (mudhakkar), and as a highly stylized introduction to a larger poem (tamhîdî).

Spread of the Arabian ghazal 
With the spread of Islam, the Arabian ghazal spread both westwards, into Africa and Spain, as well as eastwards, into Persia. The popularity of ghazals in a particular region was usually preceded by a spread of the Arabic language in that country. In medieval Spain, ghazals written in Hebrew as well as Arabic have been found as far back as the 11th century. It is possible that ghazals were also written in the Mozarabic language. Ghazals in the Arabic form have also been written in a number of major West African literary languages like Hausa and Fulfulde.

Dispersion into Persia

Early Arabo-Persian ghazals (10th to 11th century) 
However, the most significant changes to the ghazal occurred in its introduction into Iran in the 10th century. The early Persian ghazals largely imitated the themes and form of the Arabian ghazal. These "Arabo-Persian" ghazals introduced two differences compared to their Arabian poetic roots. Firstly, the Persian ghazals did not employ radical enjambment between the two halves of the couplet, and secondly, the Persian ghazals formalized the use of the common rhyme in both lines of the opening couplet ("matla"). The imitation of Arabian forms in Persia extended to the qaṣīda, which was also popular in Persia.

Because of its comparative brevity, thematic variety and suggestive richness, the ghazal soon eclipsed the qaṣīda, and became the most popular poetry form in Persia. Much like Arabian ghazals, early Persian ghazals typically employed more musical meters compared to other Persian poetry forms. Rudaki (858–941 CE) is considered the most important Persian ghazal poet of this period, and the founder of classical Persian literature.

Early Persian ghazal poetry (12th to early 13th century) 
The Persian ghazal evolved into its own distinctive form between the 12th and 13th centuries. Many of those innovations created what we now recognize as the archetypical ghazal form. These changes occurred in two periods, separated by the Mongol Invasion of Persia from 1219 to 1221 AD.

The 'Early Persian poetry' period spanned approximately one century, from the Ghaznavid era (which lasted until 1187) till a little after the Mongol Invasion. Apart from the movement towards brevity, this period also saw two significant and lasting changes to the ghazal form.

The first change was the adoption of the Takhallus, the practice of mentioning the poet's pen-name in the final couplet (called the maqta). The adoption of the takhallus became a gradually accepted part of the ghazal form, and by the time of Saadi Shirazi (1210–1291 AD), the most important ghazal poet of this period, it had become de rigueur. The second marked change from Arabian ghazal form in Persian ghazals was a movement towards far greater autonomy between the couplets.

Late Persian poetry in the Early Mongol Period (1221–) 
The ghazal later spread throughout the Middle East and South Asia. It was famous all around the Indian subcontinent in the 18th and 19th centuries

Introduction into Indian subcontinent 

The ghazal was spread from Persia into South Asia in the 12th century by the influence of Sufi mystics and the courts of the new Islamic sultanates. This period coincided with the early Islamic Sultanates in India, through the wave of Islamic invasions into the region in that period. The 13th-century poet and musician Ameer Khusrow is not only credited as the first Urdu poet but also created Hindustani as we know today by merging braj, khadhi boli, Hindi, Urdu, Persian and other local dialects.

During the reign of the Sultan of Bengal Ghiyasuddin Azam Shah, the city of Sonargaon became an important centre of Persian literature, with many publications of prose and poetry. The period is described as the "golden age of Persian literature in Bengal". Its stature is illustrated by the Sultan's own correspondence with the Persian poet Hafez. When the Sultan invited Hafez to complete an incomplete ghazal by the ruler, the renowned poet responded by acknowledging the grandeur of the king's court and the literary quality of Bengali-Persian poetry.

It is said that Atul Prasad Sen pioneered the introduction of Bengali ghazals. Residing in Lucknow, he was inspired by Persian ghazals and experimented with a stream of Bengali music which was later enriched profusely by the contribution of Kazi Nazrul Islam and Moniruddin Yusuf.

Themes 
"The ghazal was initially composed to a purely religious theme". Now in this era ghazals are more likely to have romantic themes.

Unconditional, superior love 

Can usually be interpreted for a higher being or for a mortal beloved. Love is always viewed as something that will complete a human being, and if attained will lift him or her into the ranks of the wise, or will bring satisfaction to the soul of the poet. Traditional ghazal law may or may not have an explicit element of sexual desire in it, and the love may be spiritual. The love may be directed to either a man or a woman.

The ghazal is always written from the point of view of the unrequited lover whose beloved is portrayed as unattainable. Most often, either the beloved has not returned the poet's love or returns it without sincerity or else the societal circumstances do not allow it. The lover is aware and resigned to this fate but continues loving nonetheless; the lyrical impetus of the poem derives from this tension. Representations of the lover's powerlessness to resist his feelings often include lyrically exaggerated violence. The beloved's power to captivate the speaker may be represented in extended metaphors about the "arrows of his eyes", or by referring to the beloved as an assassin or a killer. Take, for example, the following couplets from Amir Khusro's Persian ghazal Nemidanam che manzel būd shab:

Sufism 
Many of the major historical ghazal poets were either avowed Sufis themselves (like Rumi or Hafiz), or were sympathizers with Sufi ideas. Somewhat like American soul music, but with melancholy instead of funk, most ghazals can be viewed in a spiritual context, with the Beloved being a metaphor for God or the poet's spiritual master. It is the intense Divine Love of Sufism that serves as a model for all the forms of love found in ghazal poetry.

Most ghazal scholars today recognize that some ghazal couplets are exclusively about Divine Love. Others are about earthly love, but many can be interpreted in either context.

Traditionally invoking melancholy, love, longing, and metaphysical questions, ghazals are often sung by Afghan, Pakistani, and Indian musicians. The form has roots in seventh-century Arabia, and gained prominence in the thirteenth and fourteenth centuries, thanks to such Persian poets as Rumi and Hafiz, and later to Indian poets such as Mirza Ghalib. In the eighteenth century, the ghazal was used by poets writing in Urdu. Among these poets, Ghalib is the recognized master.

Important ghazal poets 

Ghazals were written by Rumi, Hafiz and Saadi Shirazi of Persia; the Turkic poets Yunus Emre, Fuzûlî and Nesimi of the Ottoman Empire; Mirza Ghalib and Muhammad Iqbal of North India; and Kazi Nazrul Islam of Bengal. Through the influence of Goethe (1749–1832), the ghazal became very popular in Germany during the 19th century; the form was used extensively by Friedrich Rückert (1788–1866) and August von Platen (1796–1835). The Kashmiri poet Agha Shahid Ali was a proponent of the form, both in English and in other languages; he edited a volume of "real Ghazals in English". Ghazals were also written by Moti Ram Bhatta (1866–1896), the pioneer of Nepali ghazal writing in Nepali. Ghazals were also written by Hamza Shinwari, He is known as the father of Pashto Ghazals.

Translations and performance of classical ghazal 
Enormous collections of ghazal have been created by hundreds of well-known poets over the past thousand years in Persian, Turkish, and Urdu as well as in the Central Asian Turkic languages. Ghazal poems are performed in Uzbek-Tajik Shashmakom, Turkish Makam, Persian Dastgah and Uyghur Muqam. There are many published translations from Persian and Turkish by Annemarie Schimmel, Arthur John Arberry and many others.

Ghazal "Gayaki", the art of singing or performing the ghazal in the Indian classical tradition, is very old. Singers like Ustad Barkat Ali and many other singers in the past used to practice it, but the lack of historical records make many names anonymous. It was with Begum Akhtar and later on Ustad Mehdi Hassan that classical rendering of ghazals became popular in the masses. The categorization of ghazal singing as a form of "light classical" music is a misconception.

Classical ghazals are difficult to render because of the varying moods of the "shers" or couplets in the ghazal. Amanat Ali Khan, Begum Akhtar, Talat Mahmood, Mehdi Hassan, Abida Parveen, Jagjit Singh, Farida Khanum and Ustad Ghulam Ali, Moinuddin Ahamed, are popular classical ghazal singers.

Popularity 
The ghazal has historically been one of the most popular poetic forms across the Middle East and South Asia. Even into the modern era the ghazal has retained its extreme popularity among South Asian royalty and nobility, among whom its education and patronisation has traditionally found shelter, especially with several Indian rulers including several Indian Emperors being profound composers of ghazals. In the 19th century ghazals gained popularity in Germany with Goethe's translations, as well as with Spanish ghazal writers such as Federico García Lorca. Despite often being written in strong Urdu and rendered with classical Indian Ragas along with complex terminology most usually accessible to the upper classes, in South Asia ghazals are nonetheless popular among all ages. They are most popular in Turkey and South Asia, and readings or musical renditions of ghazals—such as at mehfils and mushairas—are well attended in these countries, even by the laity. Ghazals are popular in South Asian film music. The ragas to which ghazals are sung are usually chosen to be in consonance with their lyrical content.

Understanding the complex lyrics of traditional ghazals required education typically available only to the upper classes. The traditional classical rāgas in which the lyrics were rendered were also difficult to understand. The ghazal has undergone some simplification in recent years, in terms of words and phrasings, which helps it to reach a larger audience around the world. Modern shayars (poets) are also moving towards a less strict adherence to form and rules, using simpler language and words (sometimes even incorporating words from other languages, such as English - see Parveen Shakir), and moving away from a strictly male narrator.

Most of the ghazals are now sung in styles that are not limited to khayāl, thumri, rāga, tāla and other classical and light classical genres. However, those forms of the ghazal are looked down on by purists of the Indian classical tradition.

In Pakistan, Noor Jehan, Iqbal Bano, Abida Parveen, Farida Khanum, Ghulam Ali, Ahmed Rushdi, Ustad Amanat Ali Khan, Parvez Mehdi and Mehdi Hassan are known for ghazal renditions. Indian Singers like Jagjit Singh (who first used a guitar in ghazals), Ahmed and Mohammed Hussain, Hariharan, Adithya Srinivasan, Pankaj Udhas, Umbayee and many others have been able to give a new shape to the ghazal by incorporating elements of Western music.

Ghazals in other South Asian Languages 
In addition to Urdu, ghazals have been very popular in the Gujarati language. For around a century, starting with Balashankar Kantharia, there have been many notable Gujarati ghazal writers including Kalapi, Barkat Virani 'Befaam', Asim Randeri, Shunya Palanpuri, Amrut Ghayal, Khalil Dhantejvi and many more. Some notable ghazals of those prominent writers have been sung by Bollywood playback singer Manhar Udhas.

Renowned ghazal singer, and pioneer of Telugu ghazals, Ghazal Srinivas popularized the ghazal in Telugu. Ghazals in the Kannada language were pioneered in the 1960s by poet Shantarasam, though recordings of their poetry only began to be made in the early 2000s. Legendary musician Umbayee composed ghazals in Malayalam and popularized this form of music across Kerala.

Suresh Bhat popularized ghazals in the Marathi language. Some of his amazing ghazals were sung by famous artists like Lata Mangeshkar and Asha Bhosale. He was known as Ghazal Samrat (the Emperor of ghazals) for his exposition of the ghazal form of poetry and its adaptation to the Marathi language. His disciple Ilahi Jamadar continued the tradition, blending Urdu and Marathi verses in his work.

Kazi Nazrul Islam brought ghazals to the Bengali language, composing numerous poems which are still famous in both Bangladesh and India.

In English 
After nearly a century of "false starts," the early experiments of James Clarence Mangan, James Elroy Flecker, Adrienne Rich, Phyllis Webb, etc., many of whom did not adhere wholly or in part to the traditional principles of the form, experiments dubbed as "the bastard Ghazal," the ghazal finally began to be recognized as a viable closed form in poetry of the English language some time in the early to mid-1990s. It came about largely as a result of serious, true-to-form examples being published by noted American poets John Hollander, W. S. Merwin and Elise Paschen as well as by Kashmiri-American poet Agha Shahid Ali, who had been teaching and spreading word of the Ghazal at American universities over the previous two decades. Jim Harrison created his own free-form Ghazal true to his poetic vision in Outlyer and Ghazals (1971).

In 1996, Ali compiled and edited the world's first anthology of English-language ghazals, published by Wesleyan University Press in 2000, as Ravishing DisUnities: Real Ghazals in English. (Fewer than one in ten of the ghazals collected in Real Ghazals in English observe the constraints of the form.)

A ghazal is composed of couplets, five or more. The couplets may have nothing to do with one another except for the formal unity derived from a strict rhyme and rhythm pattern.

A ghazal in English observes the traditional restrictions of the form:
Where are you now? Who lies beneath your spell tonight?
Whom else from rapture's road will you expel tonight?

Those "Fabrics of Cashmere—" "to make Me beautiful—"
"Trinket"— to gem– "Me to adorn– How– tell"— tonight?

I beg for haven: Prisons, let open your gates–
A refugee from Belief seeks a cell tonight.

God's vintage loneliness has turned to vinegar–
All the archangels– their wings frozen– fell tonight.

Lord, cried out the idols, Don't let us be broken
Only we can convert the infidel tonight.

Mughal ceilings, let your mirrored convexities
multiply me at once under your spell tonight.

He's freed some fire from ice in pity for Heaven.
He's left open– for God– the doors of Hell tonight.

In the heart's veined temple, all statues have been smashed
No priest in saffron's left to toll its knell tonight.

God, limit these punishments, there's still Judgment Day–
I'm a mere sinner, I'm no infidel tonight.

Executioners near the woman at the window.
Damn you, Elijah, I'll bless Jezebel tonight.

The hunt is over, and I hear the Call to Prayer
fade into that of the wounded gazelle tonight.

My rivals for your love– you've invited them all?
This is mere insult, this is no farewell tonight.

And I, Shahid, only am escaped to tell thee–
God sobs in my arms. Call me Ishmael tonight.

— Agha Shahid Ali

Notable poets who composed ghazals in English
 Agha Shahid Ali, "Ghazal ('...exiles')"
 Robert Bly, The Night Abraham Called to the Stars and My Sentence Was a Thousand Years of Joy
 Francis Brabazon, In Dust I Sing (Beguine Library, 1974).
 Fern G. Z. Carr,  "Ghazal for M."
 G.S. Sharat Chandra, "The Anonymous Lover"
 Andrew D. Chumbley, "Qutub" (Xoanon), 1995.
 Lorna Crozier, "Bones in Their Wings"
 Sukhdarshan Dhaliwal, "Ghazals at Twilight" (SD Publications), 2009
 Judith Fitzgerald, Twenty-Six Ways Out of This World (Oberon), 1999.
Marilyn Hacker, A Stranger's Mirror: New and Selected Poems 1994 - 2014 (2015) ISBN 978-0-393-24464-9
 Jim Harrison, Outlyer and Ghazals (Touchstone), 1971
 John Hollander, "Ghazal On Ghazals"
 Galway Kinnell, "Sheffield Ghazal 4: Driving West", "Sheffield Ghazal 5: Passing the Cemetery" (Mariner Books), 2001
 Marilyn Krysl, "Ghazals for the Turn of the Century"
 Maxine Kumin, "On the Table"
 Edward Lowbury, "A Ghazel (for Pauline)" (1968); "Prometheus: a ghazel" (1976); "Remembering Nine (a ghazel for Peter Russell)" (1981)
 William Matthews, "Guzzle", "Drizzle"
 W. S. Merwin, "The Causeway"
 Elise Paschen, "Sam's Ghazal"
 Robert Pinsky, "The Hall"
 Spencer Reece, Florida Ghazals
 Adrienne Rich, Ghazals: Homage to Ghalib
 John Thompson, "Stilt Jack" (Anansi), 1978.
 Natasha Trethewey, "Miscegenation", 2006.
 Phyllis Webb, Water and Light: Ghazals and Anti Ghazals (Coach House), 1984.
 John Edgar Wideman, "Lost Letter"
 Eleanor Wilner, "Ghazal on What's to Lose, or Not"
 Rob Winger, "The Chimney Stone" (Nightwood Editions), 2010

Ghazal in Music

Ghazals has been used in music throughout South Asia and has become a genre of its own, simply called "Ghazal" which refers to the music genre. The Ghazal music genre is most popular in Afghanistan, Pakistan and India.

Some notable Afghan ghazal singers are (Persian/Pashtu):
 Sarahang
 Ulfat

Some notable Pakistani and Indian ghazal singers are (Urdu/Hindi):

 Ahmed Rushdi
 Abida Parveen
 Ali Sethi
 Amjad Parvez
 Anuradha Paudwal
 Anup Jalota
 Ataullah Khan
 Ateeq Hussain Khan
 Salma Agha
 Kiran Ahluwalia
 Begum Akhtar
 Najma Akhtar
 Ghulam Ali
 Talat Aziz
 Gulbahar Bano
 Iqbal Bano
 Beauty Sharma Barua
 Munni Begum
 Asha Bhosle
 Rahmatullah Dard
 Chandan Dass
 Hariharan
 Mehdi Hassan
 Ahmed and Mohammed Hussain
 Cassius Khan
 Nusrat Fateh Ali Khan
 Ustad Amanat Ali Khan
 Asad Amanat Ali Khan
 Shafqat Amanat Ali Khan
 Shreya Ghoshal
 Bade Fateh Ali Khan
 Hamid Ali Khan
 Shahabaz Aman
 Khalil Haider
 Farida Khanum
 Runa Laila
 Master Madan
 Talat Mahmood
 Mahwash
 Lata Mangeshkar
 Penaz Masani
 Aziz Mian
 Habib Wali Mohammad
 Mukesh
 Sonu Nigam
 Nizami Brothers
 Nayyara Noor
 Noorjehan
 Bhimrao Panchale
 Shishir Parkhie
 Malika Pukhraj
 Mohammed Rafi
 Roop Kumar Rathod
 Sunali Rathod
 Reshma
 Rahat Fateh Ali Khan
 Sabri Brothers
 Jagjit Singh
 Sajjad Ali
 Mohammad Hussain Sarahang
 Mohammad Reza Shajarian
 Bhupinder and Mitali Singh
 Jasvinder Singh
 Ghazal Srinivas
 Adithya Srinivasan
 Tahira Syed
 Manhar Udhas
 Nirmal Udhas
 Pankaj Udhas
 Suresh Wadkar
 Ahmad Wali
 Alka Yagnik
 Umbayee

Many Indian and Pakistani film singers are famous for singing ghazals, such as these:

 Ahmed Rushdi
 Hariharan
 Mehdi Hassan
 Jagjit Singh
 Noor Jehan
 Talat Mahmood
 Lata Mangeshkar
 Srilekha Parthasarathy
 Mohammad Rafi
 Shiv Dayal Batish
 Shreya Ghoshal
 Ghulam Ali
 K. L. Saigal
 Chitra Singh
 Asha Bhosle
 Tina Sani

Some Malay singers are famous for singing Ghazal, such as these:

 Jamal Abdillah
 Sharifah Aini
 Rosiah Chik
 Noraniza Idris
 Rhoma Irama
 M. Nasir

See also 
 Filmi-ghazal, Indian filmi music based on ghazal poetry

Footnotes

References 
 Agha Shahid Ali (ed.). Ravishing Disunities: Real Ghazals in English. 
 Agha Shahid Ali. Call Me Ishmael Tonight: A Book of Ghazals. 
 Bailey, J. O. The Poetry of Thomas Hardy: A handbook and Commentary. 
 Doty, Gene (ed. 1999–2014) and Jensen, Holly (ed. 2015-today). The Ghazal Page; various postings, 1999—today
 Kanda, K.C., editor. Masterpieces of the Urdu Ghazal: From the 17th to the 20th Century. Sterling Pub Private Ltd., 1991
 Mufti, Aamir. "Towards a Lyric History of India." boundary 2, 31: 2, 2004
 Reichhold, Jane (ed.). Lynx; various issues, 1996–2000
 Sells, Michael A. Early Islamic Mysticism. 
 Watkins, R. W. (ed.). Contemporary Ghazals; Nos. 1 and 2, 2003–2004
 Lall, Inder jit. "Ghazal Movements", Century, May 23, 1964
 Lall, Inder jit. "Heightened sensibility" The Economic Times, December 31, 1978
 Lall, Inder jit. "The Ghazal – Evolution & Prospects", The Times of India, November 8, 1970
 Lall, Inder Jit. "The New Ghazal", The Times of India, July 3, 1971
 Lall, Inder jit. "Ghazal: A Sustainer of Spasms", Thought, May 20, 1967
 Lall, Inder jit. "Tuning into modern ghazals", Sunday Herald, January 29, 1989
 Lall, Inder Jit. "Ghazal: Melodies and minstrels", Sunday Patriot, June 29, 1986
 Lall, Inder jit. "Charm of ghazal lies in lyricism", Hindustan Times, August 8, 1985

External links 

 
 A Desertful of Roses The Divan-e Ghalib – in Urdu, with Devanagari and Roman transliterations.
 Ghazal Radio dedicated ghazal radio.
 Ghazal poets A list of ghazal writers.
 Mere Rashke Qamar One of the Best ghazal of Nusrat Fateh Ali Khan.
 Ghazals Manuscript, Rare Book & Manuscript Library University of Pennsylvania LJS 44

 
Persian literature
Persian poetry
Urdu-language literature
Arabic and Central Asian poetics
Pakistani poetics
Literary genres
Indian music
Pakistani music
Ancient Persian literature
Persian poetic forms
Arabic poetry forms